Tommaso Rinaldi (born 18 January 1991) is an Italian diver. Born in Rome, he competed in the 3 m springboard event at the 2012 Summer Olympics. His father, Domenico Rinaldi was also an Olympic diver who participated in the 1984 and 1988 games.

Rinaldi is an athlete of the Gruppo Sportivo della Marina Militare, before he competed for Gruppo Sportivo Fiamme Oro.

References 

1991 births
Living people
Divers at the 2012 Summer Olympics
Olympic divers of Italy
Italian male divers
Divers of Marina Militare
Divers of Fiamme Oro
Divers from Rome